Martin Vargas (born February 22, 1978) is a former professional baseball pitcher. He played primarily in the minor leagues of the United States. 

He later played in the Japanese Central League for Chunichi Dragons (2002–2005), and the Korea Baseball Organization for the Samsung Lions in 2005. Playing for the Lions, he was the losing pitcher in Game 2 of the 2005 Asia Series, as the Lions fell to the Chiba Lotte Marines 6-2.

Martin later played for the Potros de Tijuana in the Mexican League. Later he played in the Dominican Winter League with Estrellas de Oriente (2006–2007), Tigres del Licey (2008–2009), and Leones del Escogido (2012–2013).  He even played for the Italian Baseball League (in 2008).

References

External links 

Chunichi Dragons players
Dominican Republic baseball players
Dominican Republic expatriate baseball players in Japan
Dominican Republic expatriate baseball players in Mexico
Dominican Republic expatriate baseball players in South Korea
Dominican Republic expatriate baseball players in Taiwan
Dominican Republic expatriate baseball players in the United States
Estrellas Orientales players
Living people
Mexican League baseball pitchers
Sportspeople from San Pedro de Macorís
Samsung Lions players
1978 births